Bobo is an unincorporated community in Gordon County, in the U.S. state of Georgia.

History
A post office called Bobo was established in 1885, and remained in operation until it was discontinued in 1905. The name honors the Bobo family of settlers.

References

Unincorporated communities in Gordon County, Georgia
Unincorporated communities in Georgia (U.S. state)